Riddick Bowe vs. Andrew Golota II was a professional boxing match contested on December 14, 1996. The bout was a rematch of a controversial fight held earlier in the year at Madison Square Garden as part of a nationally televised HBO event.

As was the case in the first fight, Golota was performing well enough to win, yet once again could not stop fouling Bowe and was disqualified for repeatedly punching Bowe in the testes.

Background

In early 1996 Bowe had agreed with Lennox Lewis to fight at some point in the year. Eventually it was agreed upon that the two would meet in September of that year, and as part of the deal both men were signed to fight two separate fights immediately before. Bowe, who had not fought since knocking out Evander Holyfield in their third meeting in 1995, signed to fight the Polish contender Golota, who was undefeated but widely unknown as a proven fighter. Bowe did not take Golota seriously and went through training half-seriously, claiming that he didn't know how to train for "a bum" and infuriating his trainer Eddie Futch, who was growing impatient with Bowe's apparent lack of desire to train. As such, Bowe came into the ring that night at 252 pounds.

Golota surprised the sluggish Bowe by dominating most of the fight, constantly and effectively using his jab and landing several powerful combinations through the course of seven rounds. However, from the second round forward, Golota ran into trouble with low blows and had one point deducted in each of the fourth and sixth rounds. Though he was ahead on all scorecards, another vicious blow to Bowe's testicles in the seventh led to referee Wayne Kelly stopping the fight and awarding Bowe the victory by disqualification. Almost immediately after the stoppage, members of Bowe's entourage entered the ring and attacked Golota, Golota traded punches with one of the men, but another, Jason Harris, struck Golota in the head with a walkie-talkie (Golota later required 11 stitches to close the resulting gash). Fans of both fighters joined the melee and fights began breaking out in the crowd. The post-fight riot led to 10 arrests and nine spectators had to be rushed to hospital. 

Bowe's performance in the first fight hurt his future twofold. Lewis pulled out of their agreed upon fight, choosing instead to pursue a match for the WBC world championship (which he would get the following year). Second, Eddie Futch announced on October 3 that he was resigning as Bowe’s trainer. The veteran handler said he felt his time was being wasted continuing to train the former champion when he would not take his conditioning seriously. 

Two weeks after the announcement by Futch, Bowe and Golota signed for a rematch which was to be held in Atlantic City, New Jersey at Boardwalk Hall on December 14, 1996. Bowe admitted he had not taken Golota seriously coming into the previous fight and attributed his poor performance to the fact that he had not trained much for the bout. For the rematch, Bowe brought in renowned trainer Mackie Shilstone and a nutritionist to monitor his training and diet and weighed in at 235 pounds for the rematch with Golota.

The Fight
As in their previous fight, Bowe had trouble landing his jab in the first round while Golota was able to effectively use his and landed nearly twice as many punches in the round than Bowe. In the second round, Golota landed a left–right combination at the one-minute mark, knocking Bowe down for only the second time in his professional career. Bowe was able to answer referee Eddie Cotton’s 10 count but was met with a furious Golota assault that lasted until Golota intentionally head butted Bowe with 30 seconds left in the round, causing Cotton to call time and deduct one point from Golota on the judge's scorecards. Golota got the worst of the head butt, as it opened up a severe cut above his left eye. Despite his foul, Golota ended the second round having dominated Bowe punch-wise, landing 71 of his 96 punches while Bowe only managed to land 11 of his 43 punches. Bowe bounced back to have a solid third round and dominated Golota during the fourth. Bowe landed a 15–punch combination that sent Golota to the canvas as the first minute of the round came to an end. It was the first time Golota had been knocked down. The combination also re-opened Golota's cut and he was forced to finish the final two minutes of the round with blood trickling from his left eye. As the second minute passed, the exhausted Golota hit Bowe with a shot to the testes that prompted a warning from Cotton. Only 20 seconds later, however, Golota again hit Bowe with another shot to the testes that sent Bowe to the canvas in pain. Cotton subsequently called time and deducted another point from Golota. Golota rebounded from his poor fourth round to have a great fifth round that saw him gain a second knockdown of Bowe. At 1:47 of the round Golota delivered an 11-punch combination that again sent Bowe to the mat. Bowe was able to answer Cotton's count but again was met with a furious rally from Golota, who was able to pin Bowe against the ropes with a barrage of power punches, though Bowe managed to survive the round. Golota continued to dominate rounds six through eight, winning all three rounds on the judge's scorecards. Golota continued to cruise in round nine and was leading on all three judges' cards.  However, with less than 10 seconds left in the round and despite repeated urgings from his trainer, Lou Duva, to finish Bowe off with jabs, he unleashed a powerful right-left-right flurry to Bowe's testes, sending Bowe to the canvas in pain.  Cotton then stopped the fight with only 2 seconds left in the round and disqualified Golota, giving Bowe his second consecutive win by disqualification.

Aftermath
The two fighters headed in opposite directions after the fight. Bowe decided to enlist in the United States Marine Corps Reserve in January 1997, but ended up leaving after only 10 days of training. Then on April 30 of that year, Bowe announced his retirement from boxing at the age of 29. Meanwhile, despite his two disqualification losses, Golota was named the WBC's number one contender, gaining the championship match with Lennox Lewis that Bowe had previously wanted prior to his fights with Golota. Golota would ultimately lose his match with Lewis by first-round knockout.

References

Golota 2
Boxing on HBO
1996 in boxing
1996 in sports in New Jersey
December 1996 sports events in the United States
Boxing matches at Boardwalk Hall